A podger spanner, or podger, is a tool in the form of a short bar, usually tapered and often incorporating a wrench at one end.

Podgers are used for erecting scaffolding and steel scenery - The pointed end is used to align the bolt holes while the spanner end is used to tighten the nuts.

Variations

Some podgers are fitted with reversible ratchet sockets for tightening/loosening nuts.
Often they come with two sizes such as a 17 mm × 19 mm or a 19 mm × 24 mm and a 27 mm × 30 mm.
Often a podger has a hole in the wrench shaft that is used to tether the wrench to the person for safety and securing the tool whilst working at heights.

References

 BS 2583: "Specification for podger spanners" (1955)

Hand tools
Scaffolding